The Allied Works Council was an organisation set up to oversee and organise military construction works in Australia during World War II.

Established in February 1942, the Allied Works Council was responsible for carrying out any works required by the Allied Forces including providing any equipment, materials or workmen required to carry out these works.

Edward Granville Theodore, a former Premier of Queensland (1919–25) and Federal Treasurer (1929–31) was appointed Director-General of the Council.

References

External links
Allied Works Council Information
National Archives of Australia Fact Sheet

Military history of Australia during World War II
1942 establishments in Australia